Éva Szemcsák (born 24 March 1975) is a Hungarian biathlete. She competed at the 1994 Winter Olympics and the 1998 Winter Olympics.

References

External links
 
 

1975 births
Living people
Biathletes at the 1994 Winter Olympics
Biathletes at the 1998 Winter Olympics
Hungarian female biathletes
Olympic biathletes of Hungary
Sportspeople from Miskolc